Novosibirsk Refinery Plant or OJSC Novosibirsk Refinery is a plant that produces products of gold, silver, platinum and other precious metals. It was established in 1926 in Moscow. Since 1941, the plant is located in Oktyabrsky District of Novosibirsk, Russia.

History
In 1941, the plant was moved to Novosibirsk.

In November 1941, the plant produced its first products.

Products
The Plant produces bullion, granules, powders of precious metals (gold, silver, platinum etc).

LBMA Certificates

Bibliography

References

Manufacturing companies based in Novosibirsk
Oktyabrsky District, Novosibirsk
Metal companies of the Soviet Union